Ferstl is a surname. Notable people with the name include:

Eberhard Ferstl (1933–2019), German field hockey player 
Josef Ferstl (born 1988), German alpine ski racer
Karl Ferstl (born 1945), Austrian sailor
Sepp Ferstl (born 1954), German alpine skier  

German-language surnames
Surnames of German origin
Surnames of Austrian origin